Wíṣ Zalmiyān/Weekh Zalmyan (Pashto: ويښ زلميان or Awakened Youth) was a left-wing  youth movement started in 1947 in Kandahar. The movement was focused on a nationalist agenda of modernization. Following a brief period of liberalisation encouraged by Prime Minister Shah Mahmud Khan, it was dissolved in a crackdown between 1951 and 1952. The crackdown has been described as a contributing factor in the radicalisation of many leaders who later established the People’s Democratic Party of Afghanistan. Noor Mohammad Tarakai stated he was a founder of the movement, and Babrak Karmal and Hafizullah Amin also said they had been involved.

References

Political movements in Afghanistan
1947 establishments in Afghanistan
1951 disestablishments in Afghanistan
Youth organizations established in 1947
Secularist organizations
Nationalist parties in Asia
Socialist parties in Asia
Defunct socialist parties in Asia